The 2016–17 Champions Hockey League was the third season of the Champions Hockey League, a European ice hockey tournament launched by 26 founding clubs, six leagues and the International Ice Hockey Federation (IIHF). The season started on 16 August 2016 with the group stage and ended with the final game on 7 February 2017 with Frölunda defeating HC Sparta Praha, 4–3 in overtime.

Team allocation 
A total of 48 teams from different European first-tier leagues participated in the 2016–17 Champions Hockey League.

Team license 
The teams were selected based on different licenses for the founding teams, leagues and wildcards.

 A license: The 26 founding teams got an A license, if they played in the first-tier league of their respective domestic league system in the 2016–17 season.
 B license: 12 teams – the regular-season winner and the play-off champion in the 2014–15 season – from each of the founding leagues (the Austrian EBEL, the Czech Extraliga, the Finnish Liiga, the German DEL, the Swedish SHL and the Swiss NLA) received a B licence to the tournament. If those teams had already received an A license, other teams from the league take the B license spots. The order the B licenses were handed out is:
 National champion
 Regular season winner
 Runner-up, regular season
 Play-off finalist
 Best placed semifinal loser
 Worst placed semifinal loser

 C license: There were 10 wild cards. The champions from Norway, Slovakia, Belarus, Denmark, France, the United Kingdom and Poland got wild cards. From Norway and Slovakia a second team, the regular season winner, also got a wild card. One wild card license was assigned to the 2015–16 IIHF Continental Cup winner Dragons de Rouen.

Teams 

Notes:
‡ – Ligue Magnus champion Dragons de Rouen had already qualified via Continental Cup.

Group stage 

The format remained the same as in the previous season. The group stage began on 16 August and finished on 11 September 2016. The 48 teams were divided into 16 groups of three teams each. Each team played a double round-robin in their group, facing each team at home and on the road, giving 4 games per team. The 16 group winners and the 16 runners-up qualified for the playoffs.

Group stage draw 
The 16 groups were determined by a draw taking place on 3 May 2016 in Zürich, Switzerland. The 48 teams had been ranked and placed into three pots of 16 teams each. Following the draw, each group consisted of one team from each pot. The seedings were as follows:

Tiebreakers 

The teams were ranked according to points (3 points for a win in regular time, 2 points for an overtime win or shootout win, 1 point for an overtime loss or shootout loss, 0 points for a loss in regular time). If two or more teams were equal on points on completion of the group matches, the following criteria were applied in the order given to determine the rankings:
higher number of points obtained in the group matches played among the teams in question;
superior goal difference from the group matches played among the teams in question;
higher number of goals scored in the group matches played among the teams in question;
higher number of wins in regular time in the group matches played among the teams in question;
higher number of goals scored in one match in the group matches played among the teams in question;
if, after having applied criteria 1 to 5, teams still had an equal ranking in a two-way tie, criteria 1 to 5 were reapplied against the third team in the group. If this procedure did not lead to a decision, criteria 7 to 10 applied;
higher number of wins in overtime;
higher number of goals scored in shootout (if both matches ended in shootout);
if two teams still remained tied and they met in their group's final game, they played a shootout to determine which team is ranked higher;
higher pre-draw rankings.

Group A

Group B

Group C

Group D

Group E

Group F

Group G

Group H

Group I

Group J

Group K

Group L

Group M

Group N

Group O

Group P

Playoffs 

In the playoffs, the teams play against each other over two legs on a home-and-away basis with the team with the better standing after the group stage having the second game at home, except for the one-match final played at the venue of the team with the best competition track record leading up to the final.

The mechanism of the draw for playoffs was as follows:
The entire playoff was drawn on 12 September 2016 and determined the sixteen pairings for the Round of 32. Also at the draw, all matches up to the final were set in the bracket.
In the draw for the Round of 32, the 16 group winners were seeded, and the 16 runners-up were unseeded. The seeded teamswere drawn against the unseeded teams, with the seeded teams hosting the second leg. Teams from the same group could be drawn against each other, but teams from the same league or country could be paired in any round.

Playoff teams

Bracket 

Note:
The teams listed on top of each tie play first match at home and the bottom team plays second match at home.
The order of the legs (what team starts at home) in the future rounds may be changed as the team with best record should have second match at home.

Round of 32 
The draw for the entire playoff (round of 32, round of 16, quarter-finals, semi-finals and final) was held on 12 September 2016. The first legs were played on 4 October, and the second legs on 11 October 2016. The seeded teams (group winners) played the last match at home.

|}

Round of 16 
The first legs were played on 1 November, and the second legs were played on 8 and 9 November 2016.

|}

Quarter-finals 
The first legs were played on 6 December, and the second legs were played on 13 December 2016.

|}

Semi-finals 
The first legs were played on 10 January, and the second legs were played on 17 January 2017.

|}

Final 
The final was played on 7 February 2017.

References 

 
Champions Hockey League seasons
1